Mary Fisher may refer to:

 Mary Fisher (activist) (born 1948), American political activist
 Mary Fisher (missionary) (c. 1623–1698), English Quaker pioneer, one of the Valiant Sixty
 Mary Fisher (swimmer) (born 1993), New Zealand Paralympian
 Mary Jo Fisher (born 1962), Australian politician
 Mary Pat Fisher (fl. 1980s–2000s), writer and religious leader
 Mary Stuart Fisher (1922–2006), American radiologist
 M. F. K. Fisher (1908–1992), American writer
 Mary Fisher, fictional romance novelist played by Meryl Streep in the 1989 film She-Devil

See also
Marie Fisher (1931–2008), Australian politician